Dunmallet or Dunmallard Hill is a small hill in the English Lake District, near Pooley Bridge, Cumbria. It is the subject of a chapter of Wainwright's book The Outlying Fells of Lakeland. It reaches  and Wainwright describes the ascent, from Pooley Bridge, as a "simple after-dinner stroll". He lists two other early spellings: Dunmalloght and Dunmallock The hill is wooded and the views from the top limited.

Remains of an Iron Age hill fort have been detected on the hill.

Etymology 
The name Dunmallet or Dunmallard may either be of Brittonic or Middle Irish origin. The most likely derivation is from Irish dùn-mallacht, meaning "fort of curses". Or else, the name may conserve a Brittonic formation of the elements dīn- ("fort") + mę:l ("bald") + -arδ ("height").

References

Fells of the Lake District
Dacre, Cumbria